The Golden Horse Award for Best Animated Short Film is an award presented annually at the Golden Horse Awards by the Taipei Golden Horse Film Festival Executive Committee. The latest ceremony was held in 2022, with Zhang Xu Zhan winning the award for the film Compound Eyes of Tropical.

References

Golden Horse Film Awards